Prabhudesai is a surname. Notable people with the surname include:

Devendra Prabhudesai, Indian biographer
Nilesh Prabhudesai (born 1967), Indian cricketer

Indian surnames